Play The Game is an Irish televised game show version of charades which was broadcast by RTÉ from 1984 to 1994. The show was hosted by Ronan Collins and featured two teams, one captained by Twink and the other by Brendan Grace. Later versions of the programme had Derek Davis as captain of the men's team.

Format
The game was based on charades, a party game where players used mime rather than speaking to demonstrate a name, phrase, book, play, film or television programme. Each player was given roughly two minutes to act out their given subject in front of his/her team, and if the others were unsuccessful in guessing correctly, the opposing team would have a chance to answer for a bonus point.

References

RTÉ original programming
Irish game shows
1980s game shows
1990s game shows